Autovía T-11 is a 17,3 km long primary highway in Catalonia connecting Reus (and its airport) and Tarragona.

References

T-11